Lone Star is the debut studio album by Welsh hard rock band Lone Star. The album was released in August 1976. The album was produced by Roy Thomas Baker, who is best known for his work with Queen and The Cars. The album was later re-issue on CD in 1992 & 1996 by CBS Records/Sony. The album only spent 1 week in the UK Albums Charts reaching number 47. The album was produced at Sweet Silence Studios, Copenhagen, Denmark and mastered at Sterling Sound Studios, New York, United States.

Track listing

Personnel 
Lone Star
 Kenny Driscoll – lead vocals
 Tony Smith – guitars, backing vocals
 Paul Chapman – guitars
 Rick Worsnop – keyboards, backing vocals
 Peter Hurley – bass
 Dixie Lee – drums, backing vocals, percussion
Technical
 Roy Thomas Baker – record producer
 Freddy Hansson – engineer
 Gary Lyons – engineer
 George Marino – cutting engineer
 Rosław Szaybo – album cover design

See also 
 Lone Star discography

References

External links 
 "Lone Star" at AllMusic

1976 debut albums
Epic Records albums
Albums produced by Roy Thomas Baker
Lone Star (band) albums